Taperoá may refer to

Taperoá, Bahia, a municipality in the Brazilian state of Bahia
Taperoá, Paraíba, a municipality in the Brazilian state of Paraíba
Taperoá River, a river of the Brazilian state of Paraíba